The Halcyon is a British television period drama broadcast on ITV which began airing on 2 January 2017. It was created and written by Charlotte Jones. The series focused on examining World War II London from 'a new perspective', and was set in 1940 at a five-star hotel "at the centre of London Society and a world at war", aiming to show London life "through the prism of war and the impact it has on families, politics, relationships and work across every social strata." Steven Mackintosh and Olivia Williams play major roles. The first episode was broadcast on 2 January 2017, and the series concluded on 20 February 2017.

The series was cancelled after one series.

Production 
The Halcyon was first announced on 3 December 2015. It was commissioned by ITV's Director of Drama Steve November and Controller of Drama Victoria Fea. The show was produced by Chris Croucher, executive produced by Sharon Hughff, Jack Lothian (also lead series writer) and Andy Harries. Left Bank Pictures were the production company of the series.

Croucher called The Halcyon "a similar beast" to Downton Abbey, although Left Bank Pictures founder and managing director Marigo Kehoe explained that the show had been in development "for a long time", and the development of the show came at a time when "new ideas were needed". Producer Chris Croucher added that "Downton has a serenity to it, but the modern world is arriving in The Halcyon", as well as revealing The Halcyons dialogue "is more punchy" and that the show "has more energy". Radio Times wrote that The Halcyon has a "little bit of Downton Abbey and a little bit of Mr Selfridge in the mix".

The cast consists of about twenty main characters. The cast was officially announced on 4 April 2016, with the news that Olivia Williams and Steven Mackintosh would star in The Halcyon. Williams commented on her character, stating that Lady Hamilton is "a trope, but wonderful to play" before adding that her character is also "an inherited aristocrat with a sharp wit who is racist, classist, homophobic...Everything you'd want her to be, to be truly hateful!". Mackintosh revealed his character as "interesting", and that "on first impressions, you might think the surface is all there is". Tointon said of her casting that "it's a lovely compliment". She also stated The Halcyon cast will be a "sexier Downton".

A cover of the song "Marvellous Party" performed by UK soul singer Beverley Knight was released as part of the series' soundtrack.

In her nude bathtub scene, Kara Tointon didn't request a body double.

Location 
The Halcyon was filmed in West London Film Studios. The exterior of the set was provided by 32 Lincoln's Inn Fields in Central London, the former Land Registry Building now owned by The London School of Economics, while further outdoor scenes were shot at Spa Fields. Further locations include Serle Street and Portugal Street, two areas around Lincoln's Inn Fields. The hotel's basement was filmed at the House of Detention in Clerkenwell's Sans Walk. The Chatham Historic Dockyard in Kent was used in episodes 5 and 6 for scenes depicting bombed London streets.

Cast

Main cast
 Annabelle Apsion as Lillian Hobbs, housekeeper
 Mark Benton as Dennis Feldman, head concierge
 Jamie Blackley as Lord Freddie Hamilton, a newly qualified RAF fighter pilot who inherits The Halcyon
 Edward Bluemel as the Honourable Toby Hamilton, Freddie's twin brother, university researcher, later civil servant
 Alex Boxall as Tom Hill, waiter
 Nick Brimble as Skinner, doorman
 Michael Carter as Wilfred Reynolds, reception manager
 Lauren Coe as Kate Loughlin, chambermaid
 Hermione Corfield as Emma Garland, receptionist, later assistant manager, Richard's daughter
 Sope Dirisu as Sonny Sullivan, West Indian bandleader and pianist
 Kevin Eldon as George Parry, head chef
 Gordon Kennedy as Robbie, chef
 Akshay Kumar as Adil Joshi, barman
 Ewan Mitchell as Billy Taylor, bellboy, Peggy's son
 Nico Rogner as Max Klein, kitchen porter and later sous chef, Austrian Jewish refugee
 Matt Ryan as Joe O'Hara, American radio correspondent and hotel guest
 Kara Tointon as Betsey Day, singer
 Charity Wakefield as Charity Lambert, Lord Hamilton's mistress and Nazi sympathiser
 Liz White as Peggy Taylor, telephonist
 Steven Mackintosh as Richard Garland, general manager
 Olivia Williams as Priscilla Hamilton, Lady Hamilton
 Charles Edwards as Lucian D'Abberville, Lady Hamilton's new amour, (mercenary) German spy

Guest stars
 Jamie Cullum as Club Singer
 Eric Godon as the Comte De St Claire, French refugee and hotel guest
 Alex Jennings as Laurence Hamilton, Lord Hamilton, hotel owner and politician, dies in first episode
 Beverley Knight as Ruby, singer
 Danny Webb as Mortimer, Special Branch officer

Supporting cast
 Doug Allen as Jim Taylor, Peggy's husband
 Jonathan Aris as Asper, German spy
 Geoffrey McGivern as Lord Ambrose, politician and former friend of Lord Hamilton
 Matthew Marsh as Delane, O'Hara's boss
 Maggie O'Neill as Gloria, Betsey's mother
 Tim Plester as Douglas, wartime acquaintance of Richard Garland
 Sophie Stanton as Evelyn, WVS ambulance driver

Episodes

References

External links

2017 British television series debuts
2017 British television series endings
2010s British drama television series
2010s British television miniseries
ITV television dramas
World War II television drama series
Television series by Left Bank Pictures
ITV miniseries
English-language television shows
Television series set in the 1940s
Television shows set in London